Trigano is a surname. Notable people with the surname include:

André Trigano (born 1925), French businessman and politician
Gilbert Trigano (1920–2001), French businessman
Shmuel Trigano (born 1948), French sociologist and philosopher